Samuel Goñi Villava (born 10 February 1994) is a Spanish footballer who plays as a forward for Los Angeles Force in the National Independent Soccer Association.

Career statistics

Club

Notes

References

External links

Samuel Goñi at Bethel University
Samuel Goñi at California State University Fullerton

1994 births
Living people
Spanish footballers
Footballers from Navarre
Cal State Fullerton Titans men's soccer players
Association football forwards
Segunda División B players
USL League Two players
Ascenso MX players
Tercera División players
CA Osasuna B players
FC Golden State Force players
Chattanooga FC players
Celaya F.C. Premier players
Spanish expatriate footballers
Expatriate soccer players in the United States
Spanish expatriate sportspeople in the United States
Expatriate footballers in Mexico
Spanish expatriate sportspeople in Mexico
Bethel Wildcats men's soccer players
Los Angeles Force players
National Independent Soccer Association players